Amorett Konfektionsfabrik was a clothing manufacturing company in Oslo, Norway.

It was established by E. Storm Røslie in 1927. The factory weft its own textiles and produced women's underwear, night gowns, pyjamas and similar clothing. The production facility was at Gustav Vigelands vei 1 at Skøyen, and was torn down in the 1960s.

References

Clothing companies established in 1927
1927 establishments in Norway

Manufacturing companies based in Oslo
Clothing companies of Norway
Defunct companies of Norway